Happily Mixed Up is a 2014 Italian comedy film directed by Massimiliano Bruno.

Cast
Claudio Bisio as Marcello
Marco Giallini as Nazareno
Anna Foglietta as Silvia
Massimiliano Bruno as Pasquale
Paola Minaccioni as Vitaliana
Caterina Guzzanti as Betta
Pietro Sermonti as Enrico
Kelly Palacios as Mercedes
Rocco Papaleo as Michelangelo
Gioele Dix as Andrea
Raffaele Vannoli as Pallotta 
Helmut Hagen as Professor Breitner

References

External links

2014 films
2010s Italian-language films
2014 comedy films
Italian comedy films
Films directed by Massimiliano Bruno
Films produced by Fulvio Lucisano
2010s Italian films